The Apexer (also known as Ricardo Richey) is a San Francisco-based public artist and mural painter. His works have appeared throughout US and internationally. He has done commissioned mural projects for museums including the deYoung Museum and San Francisco Museum of Modern Art.

Biography 
Apexer was born in San Francisco, California in 1978. He is a third generation San Franciscan. He is Latino and African-American.

Apexer studied classical art techniques, architecture, graphic design, and art history while trying to develop his own artistic identity. Apexer credits the San Francisco-based community organization, Precita Eyes with guiding him to finding his own artist voice.  “If I’m painting from my imagination, I’m representing everybody,” said APEX. “I’m not representing one person. Or one race.”

Public Works 

 Stadia Bar, Caesars Palace, Las Vegas, 2021
 Hayes Valley Playground, 2019 
 Haight Street Summer of Love in collaboration with de Young Museum, 2017
 Timbuk2 Flagship Store Front in Brooklyn, 2017
 Space NK First Boutique in San Francisco, 2016

References

External links 
 APEXER at Mirus Gallery
 Apexer, The Path of Intuition, Interview by Kristin Farr, Juxtapoz Art & Culture magazine

American muralists
Street artists
American contemporary painters
American graffiti artists
Living people
1978 births
Artists from San Francisco